Parvilux is a genus of lanternfishes.

Species 
There are currently two recognized species in this genus:
 Parvilux ingens C. L. Hubbs & Wisner, 1964
 Parvilux boschmai C. L. Hubbs & Wisner, 1964 (Giant lampfish)

References

 http://data.gbif.org/species/browse/taxon/13224482

Myctophidae
Extant Pliocene first appearances
Marine fish genera
Taxa named by Carl Leavitt Hubbs